Otho French Strahl (June 3, 1831 – November 30, 1864) was an American attorney and a brigadier general in the Confederate States Army during the American Civil War. He was one of a small number of Southern generals who were born in the North.

Biography
Otho F. Strahl was born near Elliotts Cross Roads, Ohio, and raised in nearby Malta, both in rural Morgan County. His parents were Philip Strahl and Rhoda French. His great-great-grandfather was Casper Strahl, an immigrant from Germany to Pennsylvania circa 1755. Both of his grandmothers had been raised in the South and, through their strong influence, Strahl became an ardent supporter of states' rights. Strahl was a graduate of Ohio Wesleyan University. He went south to Tennessee, reading law in Somerville and, being admitted to the bar in 1858, opening a practice in Dyersburg.

With the outbreak of the Civil War, Strahl raised a local infantry company among friends and neighbors in Dyersburg. He became the captain of his company of the newly raised 4th Tennessee Infantry in May 1861. He and the regiment were transferred to Confederate service in August of that year. He was promoted to lieutenant colonel on May 15, 1862. After the Battle of Shiloh on April 24 Strahl was promoted to colonel and led his unit into the Battle of Perryville. The regiment was reorganized and consolidated with the 5th Tennessee Infantry Regiment in December right before the Battle of Stones River. Strahl led this 4th-5th Consolidated Tennessee Infantry till he was assigned to command the brigade of Alexander P. Stewart in June 1863, and was promoted to Brigadier General on July 28. He commanded a brigade in the campaigns of Chickamauga, Chattanooga and Atlanta. On November 30, 1864, at the Battle of Franklin, Strahl was leading his men on foot, when he was shot in the neck; he was struck and killed by another two bullets to the head. His body was taken to the back porch of the local Carnton plantation house, where he lay until he was buried near the battlefield.

He was later reinterred in Old City Cemetery in Dyersburg, Tennessee.

See also

List of American Civil War generals (Confederate)

References
 Eicher, John H., and David J. Eicher, Civil War High Commands. Stanford: Stanford University Press, 2001. .
 Sifakis, Stewart. Who Was Who in the Civil War. New York: Facts On File, 1988. .
 Warner, Ezra J. Generals in Gray: Lives of the Confederate Commanders. Baton Rouge: Louisiana State University Press, 1959. .

Historical Marker
Strahl monument near Malta, Ohio
Strahl at OhioHistory.org

External links
 

Confederate States Army brigadier generals
People of Ohio in the American Civil War
Confederate States of America military personnel killed in the American Civil War
People from McConnelsville, Ohio
1831 births
1864 deaths
Northern-born Confederates
Ohio Wesleyan University alumni
People of Tennessee in the American Civil War
People from Dyersburg, Tennessee
Tennessee lawyers
American lawyers admitted to the practice of law by reading law
People from Malta, Ohio
19th-century American lawyers